Dominic Anthony Sherwood (born 6 February 1990) is an English actor and model, best known for his roles as Christian Ozera in the teen vampire film Vampire Academy (2014), Jace Wayland on the Freeform fantasy series Shadowhunters (2016-2019), Kurt in the series Penny Dreadful: City of Angels (2020) and Jeff Murphy in the Netflix legal drama Partner Track (2022).

Early life
Sherwood was born in Tunbridge Wells, Kent. He attended Oakwood Park Grammar School in Maidstone for his secondary school education. After studying drama and theatre in Maidstone and Sevenoaks, he left to work abroad, starting in Kenya and working for six months before moving to London.

Career
Sherwood's first acting role came in 2010, with his appearance as Jack Simmons in the third season of The Cut. The following year, he guest starred as a waiter named Tom in the Sadie J episode "Cherylistic". In 2012, he had a small role in the drama film Not Fade Away as a young Mick Jagger. He landed his first notable role in 2014, as Christian Ozera in the satirical horror film Vampire Academy, based on the novel by Richelle Mead.

In February 2015, he became known for his appearance in Taylor Swift's music video for her single "Style", which was directed by Kyle Newman. On 20 April 2015, it was announced he was chosen to play Jace Herondale  in the Freeform fantasy drama series Shadowhunters, an adaptation of Cassandra Clare's The Mortal Instruments book series. He also co-starred alongside Ed Westwick and Jeremy Sumpter in the thriller film Billionaire Ransom, and will appear in the horror-thriller film Don’t Sleep with Drea de Matteo and Cary Elwes.

In 2020, Sherwood starred in the dark fantasy TV series Penny Dreadful: City of Angels, which was cancelled after one season.

On 13 September 2021 it was reported that Sherwood will be starring in a reboot of Arnold Schwarzenegger's 1996 film Eraser titled Eraser: Reborn which is currently in post-production and is scheduled to be released in 2022. It was reported on 15 March 2022 that the movie will be released on Digital, Blu-ray & DVD on 7 June 2022, and will also be available for streaming on HBO Max in autumn 2022.

Sherwood will also be starring in the upcoming Netflix series Partner Track based on Helen Wan's novel of the same name. Principle production for the series began in September 2021 and ended in late February 2022 in New York. On 30 July Netflix released the official trailer for Partner Track confirming that the series will be released on 26 August 2022. 

On 11 April 2022 he is set to begin hosting a Shadowhunters rewatch podcast with co-star Katherine McNamara called Return to the Shadows.

Personal life
Sherwood has sectoral heterochromia; one of his eyes is blue while the other is half blue-half brown.

Filmography

References

External links
 
 

1990 births
21st-century English male actors
English male child actors
English male film actors
English male models
English male television actors
Living people
People educated at Millfield